A delicate prime, digitally delicate prime, or weakly prime number is a prime number where, under a given radix but generally decimal, replacing any one of its digits with any other digit always results in a composite number.

Definition 
A prime number is called a digitally delicate prime number when, under a given radix but generally decimal, replacing any one of its digits with any other digit always results in a composite number. A weakly prime base-b number with n digits must produce  composite numbers after every digit is individually changed to every other digit. There are infinitely many weakly prime numbers in any base. Furthermore, for any fixed base there is a positive proportion of such primes.

History 
In 1978, Murray S. Klamkin posed the question of whether these numbers existed. Paul Erdős proved that there exists an infinite number of "delicate primes" under any base.

In 2007, Jens Kruse Andersen found the 1000-digit weakly prime . This is the largest known weakly prime number .

In 2011, Terence Tao proved in a 2011 paper, that delicate primes exist in a positive proportion for all bases. Positive proportion here means as the primes get bigger, the distance between the delicate primes will be quite similar, thus not scarce among prime numbers.

Widely digitally delicate primes 
In 2021, Michael Filaseta of the University of South Carolina tried to find a delicate prime number such that when you add an infinite number of leading zeros to the prime number and change any one of its digits, including the leading zeros, it becomes composite. He called these numbers widely digitally delicate. He with a student of his showed in the paper that there exists an infinite number of these numbers, although they could not produce a single example of this, having looked through 1 to 1 billion. They also proved that a positive proportion of primes are widely digitally delicate.

Jon Grantham gave an explicit example of a 4032-digit widely digitally delicate prime.

Examples 
The smallest weakly prime base-b number for bases 2 through 10 are:

In the decimal number system, the first weakly prime numbers are:
294001, 505447, 584141, 604171, 971767, 1062599, 1282529, 1524181, 2017963, 2474431, 2690201, 3085553, 3326489, 4393139 .
For the first of these, each of the 54 numbers 094001, 194001, 394001, ..., 294009 are composite.

References 

Classes of prime numbers
Base-dependent integer sequences